Farrer Park Hospital is a private tertiary healthcare institution in Farrer Park, Singapore. Located above the Farrer Park MRT station at the Connexion building, the hospital has a capacity of 220 beds across four inpatient suites and 18 operating theaters including major surgery, cardiovascular and endoscopic suites. It is interconnected with the Farrer Park Medical Centre, where there are 10 floors of suites for over 200 medical specialists, as well as One Farrer Hotel.

Equipped with smart systems, the hospital is built to be future-proof. Doctors have electronic tablets and/or phones linked to the hospital systems, allowing them to get real-time updates of patients' scans and test results. This also helps them in ordering medication for patients on the go. Technology is woven into "every facet of treatment and patient experience." 

Notable treatments include the Transurethral microwave thermotherapy to treat benign prostate hyperplasia, the enlargement of the prostate as well as the introduction of pressurized intraperitoneal aerosolized chemotherapy treatment for late-stage peritoneal cancer.

History
Farrer Park Hospital was opened on March 16, 2016 by Health Minister Gan Kim Yong. Plans for the hospital were first announced in 2008. Construction took place from 2009 through 2014, with the first clinic opening at Farrer Park Medical Centre in May 2014. Other facilities in the hospital opened in phases.

The hospital was founded, developed and managed by physicians where their collective clinical and patient-fronting experiences led to the creation of a patient-centric and clinically functional private healthcare facility.

References

Hospital buildings completed in 2016
Hospitals in Singapore
Hospitals established in 2016
2016 establishments in Singapore